A best kept village is a village that has won one of the annual county competitions in the United Kingdom for its tidiness, appropriateness, and typicality. The competitions have been nationally organized by the Campaign to Protect Rural England (CPRE) since the early 1970s.

Criteria
Competing villages fall into one of four groups:

A panel of anonymous judges, touring between May and June and conducting final judging in July and August, evaluates each village on the following criteria:
 Absence of litter and unsightly refuse dumps on verges (10 points)
 Condition of village greens, playing fields, school yards, public seats, and noticeboards (10 points)
 Condition of public and private buildings, gardens, and allotments (10 points)
 Condition of churchyards, cemeteries, and war memorials (10 points)
 Condition of public halls, sports facilities, and car parks (10 points)
 Cleanliness of public toilets, bus shelters, and telephone kiosks (10 points)
 State of footpaths, stiles, field gates, signposting, ponds, and streams (10 points)
 Condition of commercial and business premises, including advertisements and other signs (10 points)
 Initiative in the care of the environment of the village (10 points)
 Evidence of community spirit and usefulness of Village Map (10 points)

The CPRE makes it clear that the competition is not about finding "the most beautiful village, nor the most ancient, nor the most picturesque, just the one that is best cared for" and "its aim is to involve everyone in the village, encouraging them to take greater pride in their surroundings." Villages are judged on how clean and well cared for they are, as well as their impact on the environment.

Awards and benefits

Winners of group A (those which have already won in the previous five years) receive the Pertwee Bowl for Past Winners, while winners in the other groups receive a CPRE shield. Group winners also receive a "Best Kept Village" road sign and certificates.

Noted benefits include decreased littering, greater community communication, communal pride in homes and public spaces, a more attractive and welcoming appearance, name recognition for the village, and increased tourism and income for local businesses.

Criticism
Criticisms of the competition include "townies" moving into villages and changing the local culture and villagers who do not fit in with the ethos of a "best kept village" may be excluded.

In fiction
 Ambridge, Borsetshire has been a winner in the radio soap opera The Archers.
  At the start of the "Dibley Live" (1998) episode of the TV comedy The Vicar of Dibley, the council members forgo entering the competition, having come in 54th out of 54 the previous year; Denfield, where a lorry-load of BSE-infected toxic waste had crashed into a nuclear fuel tanker causing a crater 200ft wide and the evacuation of the entire village, was 53rd.
 Much of the plot to the 2007 British film Hot Fuzz revolves around the lengths the citizens of Sanford will go to in their attempt at keeping a best kept village award.

References

External links

British awards
Competitions in the United Kingdom
Villages in the United Kingdom